Erik Nathan Nieder (born September 1, 1989) is an American Christian musician and worship leader, who primarily plays Christian pop and folk music. He has released two studio albums, Secret of the Burning Heart, in 2013, and Valley of the Shadow, in 2015, both independently.

Early and personal life
Nieder was born, Erik Nathan Nieder, on September 1, 1989, in Dallas, Texas, the son of John William and Teryl Lynn Nieder (née, Thompson), where he grew up in nearby Coppell, Texas, playing baseball while enrolled at Coppell High School. He has an older sibling, Katie Jean Nieder. He started penning his own music at thirteen years-old. His collegiate studies took place at Texas A&M University, where he was involved with the Baptist Collegiate Ministry.

Music career
He started his music recording career in 2013, with the studio album, Secret of the Burning Heart, that was released on April 9, 2013. His subsequent studio album, Valley of the Shadow, was released on September 1, 2015, when he turn 26 years-old. The song, "Dead Man Walking, as performed by John Tibbs featuring Ellie Holcomb, was written for his second album, and the rendition of the song by Tibbs and Holcomb is charting on various Billboard magazine charts. His first extended play, The Narrow Sea, was released on February 26, 2016.

Discography
Studio albums
 Secret of the Burning Heart (April 9, 2013)
 Valley of the Shadow (September 1, 2015)
 "The Narrow Sea" EP (February 26, 2016)

References

External links
 Official website

1989 births
Living people
American performers of Christian music
Musicians from Dallas
Songwriters from Texas
Texas A&M University alumni